.earth is a generic top-level domain (gTLD) in the Domain Name System of the internet. It was delegated to Interlink Co., Ltd. on 12 May 2015.

Reference section 

Generic top-level domains